31st Ashura Division was a division of the Islamic Revolutionary Guard Corps. It covers the provinces of East Azarbaijan, West Azarbaijan, and Ardabil.

It was first officially organized as the 1st Ashura Brigade under command of Mohammad Ali Jaafari during Iran–Iraq War, just before Operation Muharram. Its units had participated in various clashes after the 1979 Revolution. The brigade was later expanded into 31st Ashura Division. It participated in various operations of the Iran–Iraq War. Its notable commander was Mehdi Bakeri After Bakeri's death in Operation Badr, Amin Shari'ati was appointed as its new commander.

The division was merged with the Basij of East Azerbaijan Province to form the East Azerbaijan Ashura Provincial Corps during the rearrangement of the IRGC units in 2008.

References 
 http://www.mashreghnews.ir/fa/news/485060/
 https://web.archive.org/web/20160816095404/http://defamoghaddas.ir/fa/unit/%D9%84%D8%B4%DA%A9%D8%B1-31-%D8%B9%D8%A7%D8%B4%D9%88%D8%B1%D8%A7

Military units and formations of Army of the Guardians of the Islamic Revolution
East Azerbaijan Province
West Azerbaijan Province
Ardabil Province
Tabriz